Poltrona Frau is a furniture-maker founded in 1912 by Sardinian-born Renzo Frau in Turin, Italy, headquartered since the early 1960s in Tolentino, Italy and specializing in leather seating for interior and automotive applications.  The company name combines "Poltrona", the Italian word for armchair, and "Frau," the last name of its founder.

Noted for their exhaustive quality standards, the company uses a 21-step leather tanning process (vs. industry standard ranging from 12-15 steps) where the full-grain leather is dyed through, so a surface scratch won’t reveal a lining underneath. 95% of the company's products are made by hand.

In 2004, Poltrona Frau acquired noted Italian furniture company Cappellini, and the Poltrona Frau Group now includes brands Poltrona Frau, Cappellini, Cassina, Alias, Nemo Lighting, Ceramica Flaminia and Fish Design. In 2014, United States-based Haworth Group purchased a controlling interest in Poltrona Frau.

As of early 2014, the company operates 70 brand stores in 65 countries.

Furniture

Noted for their catalogue of iconic furniture designs, including the 1930 Vanity Fair armchair and the Dezza armchair designed by Gio Ponti in 1963, Poltrona Frau seating was used for the Walt Disney Concert Hall in Los Angeles CA.

In 2006, the company marketed a knock down version of its Viking chair at their SoHo, New York store, packing the pieces in a single easy-to-carry white gift box with an orange ribbon, requiring only the use of an included allen wrench to assemble the piece.

Beginning in 2011, the company marketed a $13,000 sofa designed by French architect and designer Jean-Marie Massaud — called the John-John sofa, in tribute to John F. Kennedy, Jr. — followed in 2012 by the John-John bed.  In 2013, the company designed and manufactured 600 seats for the Arena Corinthians in São Paulo, Brazil, the first time the company produced seats for a football stadium.

Transportation seating

In addition to designing seating for yachts, airplanes and helicopters, Poltrona Frau has designed leather interiors for automobiles since 1986, when Lancia asked the company to design and manufacture interiors for their new version 8.32 Thema model. Poltrona Frau has since made interiors from automotive companies ranging from Alfa Romeo, Audi, Bugatti, Lancia, Ferrari and Maserati to Mini, Fiat, Infiniti, Jaguar and Chrysler.

In 2002 the company's leathersmiths created red leather seating and pillions for a special edition of the California model of noted Italian motorcycle manufacturer Moto Guzzi, in celebration of the company's 80th anniversary.

Museum
To mark its centennial in 2012, the company opened the Poltrona Frau Museum, designed by Italian architect Michele De Lucchi, formerly of the Memphis Group, at the company's headquarters and production facility in Tolentino.

The museum features approximately sixty of the company's emblematic furniture pieces, many from the collection of board chairman Franco Moschini, and organizes the company's history and production with examples of furniture, drawings, images and manufacturing materials in a 1400 square meter building under the theme “l’intelligenza delle mani," which translates "intelligence of the hands," or roughly "manual know-how".

A primary video gallery highlights a technical glossary of the company: nine hand tools, methods and materials — including the curved needle, nails, horsehair, quilting and the hammer — the tools and materials required to fold, stitch, attach and work leather.

See also 

List of Italian companies

References

External links 

Furniture companies of Italy
Leather manufacturers
Italian brands
Companies based in le Marche
Design companies of Italy
Industrial design firms
Manufacturing companies established in 1912
Italian companies established in 1912
High fashion brands
Luxury brands
Museums in Marche
Design companies established in 1912